Rüdiger Lucassen (born 19 August 1951) is a German politician for the Alternative for Germany (AfD) party and, since 2017, he has been a member of the Bundestag.

Life and politics

Lucassen was born 1951 in the West German village of Westerholz and studied at the Helmut Schmidt University in Hamburg and became a commissioned officer of the Bundeswehr, the West German military force.
Lucassen entered the populist AfD in 2016 and became after the 2017 German federal election member of the Bundestag.
In October 2019, Lucassen was made chairman of the state association of the AfD in North Rhine-Westphalia.

References

1951 births
Politicians from Schleswig-Holstein
Members of the Bundestag for North Rhine-Westphalia
Living people
Helmut Schmidt University alumni
Members of the Bundestag 2021–2025
Members of the Bundestag 2017–2021
Members of the Bundestag for the Alternative for Germany
People from Schleswig-Flensburg